Pavel de Shtiglits (born 1892, date of death unknown) was a Russian sprinter. He competed in the men's 100 metres at the 1912 Summer Olympics.

References

1892 births
Year of death missing
Athletes (track and field) at the 1912 Summer Olympics
Male sprinters from the Russian Empire
Olympic competitors for the Russian Empire
Place of birth missing